Toowoomba South or South Toowoomba may refer to a number of things in Toowoomba, Queensland, Australia, including:

 Electoral district of Toowoomba South, an electorate in the Queensland Legislative Assembly
 South Toowoomba, Queensland, a suburb
 Toowoomba South State School, a former school and heritage-listed building